The Iroquois Stakes may refer to: 
Iroquois Stakes (Churchill Downs), in Kentucky
Iroquois Handicap, at Belmont Park